Dam Hara (also Romanized as Dam Harā; also known as Dam Harā’ī and Dam Havā’ī) is a village in Mehran Rural District, in the Central District of Bandar Lengeh County, Hormozgan Province, Iran. At the 2006 census, its population was 151, in 30 families.

References 

Populated places in Bandar Lengeh County